USS L-1 (SS-40) was an L-class submarine of the United States Navy.  Her keel was laid down on 13 April 1914 by Fore River Shipbuilding Company in Quincy, Massachusetts. She was launched on 20 January 1915 sponsored by Mrs. Freeland A. Daubin, and commissioned on 11 April 1916 with Lieutenant Junior Grade Freeland A. Daubin in command.

Service history
After trials and exercises in New England waters, L-1 was assigned to the Atlantic Submarine Flotilla operating along the East Coast. Throughout 1916, she ranged the Atlantic Ocean from New England to Florida developing and testing new techniques of undersea warfare. When the United States entered World War I, L-1 underwent extensive overhaul at Philadelphia, Pennsylvania, to prepare her for vital tasks ahead.

Departing New London, Connecticut, on 27 November 1917, the submarine sailed for European waters to protect Allied shipping lanes from U-boat attacks. Following brief operations in the Azores, L-1 sailed to the British Isles for patrol duty out of Bantry Bay, Ireland, beginning in early February 1918. She operated in British waters throughout the war, reducing the U-boat threat.

With the defeat of the Central Powers, L-1 departed the Isle of Portland, England, on 3 January 1919 and arrived Philadelphia on 1 February. From 1919 to 1922, she operated along the Atlantic coast experimenting with new torpedoes and undersea detection equipment. The technological advances through tests performed by L-1 and her sister submarines during the post-World War I era added to the strength and quality of the U.S. submarines that contributed to the defeat of Japan in World War II. L-1 decommissioned at Hampton Roads Submarine Base on 7 April 1922. She was sold on 31 July 1922 to Pottstown Steel Company for scrapping.

Notes

References

External links
 

United States L-class submarines
World War I submarines of the United States
Ships built in Quincy, Massachusetts
1915 ships